Woodrow Wilson Clarence Dumart (December 23, 1916 – October 19, 2001) was a Canadian professional ice hockey player, most notably for the Boston Bruins of the National Hockey League.  He is an Honoured Member of the Hockey Hall of Fame.  Dumart's uncle Ezra Dumart was also a professional ice hockey player.

Amateur career
Dumart was raised in Kitchener, Ontario.  He played his junior hockey with the Kitchener Greenshirts of the Ontario Hockey Association on a line with childhood friends Milt Schmidt and Bobby Bauer, which was dubbed the "Kraut line" by Albert Leduc, a defenceman for the Montreal Canadiens. After two seasons with the Greenshirts, the entire Kraut Line was signed by the Bruins.

Professional career
After spending the bulk of the 1935–36 and 1936–37 seasons in the minor leagues with the Boston Cubs of the Can-Am League, Dumart made the Bruins for good in early 1937.  Reunited with Schmidt and Bauer, the trio become one of the most famous lines in hockey history.  Dumart scored his first NHL goal on February 21, 1937 in a 2-2 tie versus the Montreal Canadiens at Boston Garden. Dumart – at 6'1", one of the largest wingers of his day – was the skilled checking and defensive component to the line, while contributing good scoring, and helped lead the Bruins to Stanley Cup victories in 1939 and 1941.  His contributions were recognized by being named the left wing on the second All-Star team in both 1939–40 and 1940–41.

Then World War II intervened – leading to the line being renamed, briefly and abortively, the "Kitchener Kids" due to anti-German sentiment – and Dumart enlisted with teammates Schmidt, Bauer and Frank Brimsek.  Joining the Royal Canadian Air Force halfway through the 1941–42 season, Dumart joined the Ottawa RCAF Flyers hockey team which challenged for the Allan Cup, Canada's senior league championship, and scored over a goal a game in leading the team to the title.  He played briefly in the fall of 1942 for the Flyers before being shipped overseas, where he served until the end of the war.

Dumart returned in 1945 and played nine more seasons for Boston, and was named a Second Team All-Star for the third time in 1947.

On March 26, 1949 Dumart scored a game-winning overtime goal in the Stanley Cup playoffs versus Toronto.

His scoring skills diminishing in his final years, he ended his NHL career with Boston after the 1954 playoffs.  He played one last stint the following season with the Providence Reds of the American Hockey League, suiting up for fifteen games before hanging up his skates at last.

Retirement

Dumart retired having played sixteen NHL seasons in all, scoring 211 goals and 218 assists for 429 points in 772 games.

He settled in the Boston area, and remained active with charitable affairs, being the longtime coach of the Bruins' Alumni Association team. He was father of three: Jeff, Judy, and Bruce.

On his way to Ray Bourque Night, with his son Jeff Dumart, at the FleetCenter, Woody suddenly became ill with heart trouble and was taken to the hospital, where he died on October 19, 2001.

He was inducted into the Hockey Hall of Fame in 1992.

Achievements
Retired as the leading scoring left wing in Bruins' history and remains fourth in that category, as well as in games played.
Played in the first two annual NHL All-Star Games, in 1947 and 1948.

Career statistics

* Stanley Cup Champion.

See also
List of NHL players who spent their entire career with one franchise

References

External links

1916 births
2001 deaths
Boston Bruins players
Boston Cubs players
Canadian ice hockey left wingers
Royal Canadian Air Force personnel of World War II
Canadian people of German descent
Hockey Hall of Fame inductees
Ice hockey people from Ontario
Kitchener Greenshirts players
Providence Reds players
Sportspeople from Kitchener, Ontario
Stanley Cup champions